Storhamar Dragons played in the GET-ligaen for the 2009–10 season. The finished fifth in the league and reached the semi-finals.

Roster
This is the Storhamar Dragons roster of the 2009/2010 season.

Storhamar Dragons seasons
2009–10 GET-ligaen season
STORM